Glasgow Kelvin may mean or refer to:

 Glasgow Kelvin (UK Parliament constituency)
 Glasgow Kelvin (Scottish Parliament constituency)
Glasgow Kelvin College, Further education college in Glasgow